The 2012 LNFA season was the 18th season of top-tier American football in Spain. The regular season was played from January 29, 2012 until the end of may, 2012.

L'Hospitalet Pioners won their 5th LNFA title and the third in a row.

System change
The competition system was changed for this season. The top six teams from the previous season were included in a new conference, called LNFA Elite, and only those were able to play for the title. At the end of the regular season, the top 4 teams of the LNFA Elite (Rivas Osos, L'Hospitalet Pioners, Valencia Firebats and Badalona Dracs) played a single-elimination tournament for the title. 5th place's team of the LNFA Elite (Barberà Rookies) went into another single-elimination game against the team placed 2nd within the other conferences' sudden death tournament (Valencia Giants) to determine which of the two will play at the LNFA Elite next season, while 6th place's team of the LNFA Elite (Sueca Ricers) will be replaced by the winner of the other conferences' sudden death tournament (Las Rozas Black Demons).

Results

LNFA Elite

Regular season

Playoffs
The four top teams will play for the 2012 LNFA title. The semifinals will be 1st vs. 4th and 2nd vs. 3rd. The games will be played in the home of the highest seed.

LNFA

Regular season

North Conference

South Conference

East Conference

Playoffs
The eight top teams will compete for the promotion to the LNFA Elite. The LNFA champions will promote, while the runner-up will play the promotion playoff against the fifth team in the LNFA Elite.

Las Rozas Black Demons promoted to LNFA Elite 2013.
Valencia Giants won the Promotion Game against Barberà Rookies and promote to LNFA Elite 2013.

External links
AEFA American Football Spanish Association

Liga Nacional de Fútbol Americano
2012 in American football